Aswaraopeta Assembly constituency is a ST reserved constituency of Telangana Legislative Assembly, India. It is one of 10 constituencies in Khammam district. It is part of Khammam Lok Sabha constituency.

Mecha Nageswara Rao of Telugu Desam Party is representing the constituency.

Mandals
The Assembly Constituency presently comprises the following Mandals:

Members of Legislative Assembly

Election results

Telangana Legislative Assembly election, 2018

See also
 List of constituencies of Telangana Legislative Assembly

References

Assembly constituencies of Telangana
Khammam district